Solomon Naumovich Rabinovich (Соломон Наумович Рабинович), better known under his pen name Sholem Aleichem (Yiddish and , also spelled  in Soviet Yiddish, ; Russian and ) (May 13, 1916), was a Yiddish author and playwright who lived in the Russian Empire and in the United States. The 1964 musical Fiddler on the Roof, based on Aleichem's stories about Tevye the Dairyman, was the first commercially successful English-language stage production about Jewish life in Eastern Europe. 

The Hebrew phrase שלום עליכם (shalom aleichem) literally means "[May] peace [be] upon you!", and is a greeting in traditional Hebrew and Yiddish.

Biography

(Voronkiv has become the prototype of Aleichem's Kasrilevka.) His father, Menachem-Nukhem Rabinovich, was a rich merchant at that time. However, a failed business affair plunged the family into poverty and Solomon Rabinovich grew up in reduced circumstances. When he was 13 years old, the family moved back to Pereiaslav, where his mother, Chaye-Esther, died in a cholera epidemic.

Sholem Aleichem's first venture into writing was an alphabetic glossary of the epithets used by his stepmother. At the age of fifteen, he composed a Jewish version of the novel Robinson Crusoe. He adopted the pseudonym Sholem Aleichem, a Yiddish variant of the Hebrew expression shalom aleichem, meaning "peace be with you" and typically used as a greeting.

In 1876, after graduating from school in Pereiaslav, he began to work as a teacher. During 1877-1880 in Sofijka village, Bohuslav region, he spent three years tutoring a wealthy landowner's daughter, Olga (Hodel)  (1865–1942).  From 1880 to 1883 he served as crown rabbi in Lubny.

On May 12, 1883, he and Olga married, against the wishes of her father, whose estate they inherited a few years later. Their first child, a daughter named Ernestina (Tissa), was born in 1884.  In 1890, Sholem Aleichem lost their entire fortune in stock speculation and fled from his creditors.  Daughter Lyalya (Lili) was born in 1887. As Lyalya Kaufman, she became a Hebrew writer. (Lyalya's daughter Bel Kaufman, also a writer, was the author of Up the Down Staircase, which was also made into a successful film.) A third daughter, Emma, was born in 1888. In 1889, Olga gave birth to a son. They named him Elimelech, after Olga's father, but at home they called him Misha. Daughter Marusi (who would one day publish "My Father, Sholom Aleichem" under her married name Marie Waife-Goldberg) was born in 1892. A final child, a son named Nochum (Numa) after Solomon's father was born in 1901 (under the name Norman Raeben he became a painter and an influential art teacher).

After witnessing the pogroms that swept through southern Russian Empire in 1905, including Kyiv, Sholem Aleichem left Kyiv (which was fictionalized as Yehupetz) and immigrated to New York City, where he arrived in 1906. His family set up house in Geneva, Switzerland, but when he saw he could not afford to maintain two households, he joined them in Geneva in 1908. Despite his great popularity, he was forced to take up an exhausting schedule of lecturing to make ends meet.  In July 1908, during a reading tour in Russia, Sholem Aleichem collapsed on a train going through Baranowicze. He was diagnosed with a relapse of acute hemorrhagic tuberculosis and spent two months convalescing in the town's hospital. He later described the incident as "meeting his majesty, the Angel of Death, face to face", and claimed it as the catalyst for writing his autobiography, Funem yarid [From the Fair]. He thus missed the first Conference for the Yiddish Language, held in 1908 in Czernovitz; his colleague and fellow Yiddish activist Nathan Birnbaum went in his place.

Sholem Aleichem spent the next four years living as a semi-invalid. During this period the family was largely supported by donations from friends and admirers (among his friends and acquaintances were fellow Yiddish authors I. L. Peretz, Jacob Dinezon, Mordecai Spector, and Noach Pryłucki). In 1909, in celebration of his 25th Jubilee as a writer, his friend and colleague Jacob Dinezon spearheaded a committee with Dr. Gershon Levine, Abraham Podlishevsky, and Noach Pryłucki to buy back the publishing rights to Sholem Aleichem’s works from various publishers for his sole use in order to provide him with a steady income. At a time when Sholem Aleichem was ill and struggling financially, this proved to be an invaluable gift, and Sholem Aleichem expressed his gratitude in a thank you letter in which he wrote,

Sholem Aleichem moved to New York City again with his family in 1914. The family lived at first in Harlem at 110 Lenox Avenue (at 116th Street) and later moved to 968 Kelly Street in the Bronx. His son, Misha, ill with tuberculosis, was not permitted entry under United States immigration laws and remained in Switzerland with his sister Emma.

Sholem Aleichem died at his Bronx apartment in 1916. He is buried in the main (old) section of Mount Carmel Cemetery in Queens, New York City.

Literary career

Like his contemporaries Mendele Mocher Sforim, I.L. Peretz, and Jacob Dinezon, Sholem Rabinovitch started writing in Hebrew, as well as in Russian. In 1883, when he was 24 years old, he published his first Yiddish story, צוויי שטיינער Tsvey Shteyner ("Two Stones"), using for the first time the pseudonym Sholem Aleichem.

By 1890 he was a central figure in Yiddish literature, the vernacular language of nearly all East European Jews, and produced over forty volumes in Yiddish. It was often derogatorily called "jargon", but Sholem Aleichem used this term in an entirely non-pejorative sense.

Apart from his own literary output, Sholem Aleichem used his personal fortune to encourage other Yiddish writers. In 1888–89, he put out two issues of an almanac, די ייִדישע פאָלקסביבליאָטעק Di Yidishe Folksbibliotek ("The Yiddish Public Library") which gave important exposure to young Yiddish writers.

In 1890, after he lost his entire fortune, he could not afford to print the almanac's third issue, which had been edited but was subsequently never printed.

Tevye the Dairyman, in Yiddish טבֿיה דער מילכיקער Tevye der Milchiker, was first published in 1894.

Over the next few years, while continuing to write in Yiddish, he also wrote in Russian for an Odessa newspaper and for Voskhod, the leading Russian Jewish publication of the time, as well as in Hebrew for Ha-melitz, and for an anthology edited by YH Ravnitzky. It was during this period that Sholem Aleichem contracted tuberculosis.

In August 1904, Sholem Aleichem edited הילף : א זאַמלבוך פיר ליטעראטור אונ קונסט Hilf: a Zaml-Bukh fir Literatur un Kunst ("Help: An Anthology for Literature and Art"; Warsaw, 1904) and himself translated three stories submitted by Tolstoy (Esarhaddon, King of Assyria; Work, Death and Sickness; The Three Questions) as well as contributions by other prominent Russian writers, including Chekhov, in aid of the victims of the Kishinev pogrom.

Critical reception
Sholem Aleichem's narratives were notable for the naturalness of his characters' speech and the accuracy of his descriptions of shtetl life.  Early critics focused on the cheerfulness of the characters, interpreted as a way of coping with adversity. Later critics saw a tragic side in his writing. He was often referred to as the "Jewish Mark Twain" because of the two authors' similar writing styles and use of pen names. Both authors wrote for adults and children and lectured extensively in Europe and the United States. When Twain heard of the writer called "the Jewish Mark Twain," he replied "please tell him that I am the American Sholem Aleichem."

Beliefs and activism
Sholem Aleichem was an impassioned advocate of Yiddish as a national Jewish language, which he felt should be accorded the same status and respect as other modern European languages. He did not stop with what came to be called "Yiddishism", but devoted himself to the cause of Zionism as well.  Many of his writings present the Zionist case. In 1888, he became a member of Hovevei Zion. In 1907, he served as an American delegate to the Eighth Zionist Congress held in The Hague.

Sholem Aleichem had a fear of the number 13. His manuscripts never had a page 13; he numbered the thirteenth pages of his manuscripts as 12a. Though it has been written that even his headstone carries the date of his death as "May 12a, 1916", his headstone reads the dates of his birth and death in Hebrew, the 26th of Adar and the 10th of Iyar, respectively.

Death

Sholem Aleichem died in New York on May 13, 1916 from tuberculosis and diabetes, aged 57, while working on his last novel, Motl, Peysi the Cantor's Son, and was buried at Old Mount Carmel cemetery in Queens. At the time, his funeral was one of the largest in New York City history, with an estimated 100,000 mourners. The next day, his will was printed in the New York Times and was read into the Congressional Record of the United States.

Commemoration and legacy

Sholem Aleichem's will contained detailed instructions to family and friends with regard to burial arrangements and marking his yahrtzeit.

He told his friends and family to gather, "read my will, and also select one of my stories, one of the very merry ones, and recite it in whatever language is most intelligible to you." "Let my name be recalled with laughter," he added, "or not at all." The celebrations continue to the present day, and, in recent years, have been held at the Brotherhood Synagogue on Gramercy Park South in New York City, where they are open to the public.

He composed the text to be engraved on his tombstone in Yiddish, given here in transliteration:

In 1997, a monument dedicated to Sholem Aleichem was erected in Kyiv; another was erected in 2001 in Moscow.

The main street of Birobidzhan is named after Sholem Aleichem; streets were named after him also in cities in Ukraine, including Kyiv, Odessa, Vinnytsia, Lviv, and Zhytomyr. In New York City in 1996, East 33rd Street between Park and Madison Avenue is additionally named "Sholem Aleichem Place". Many streets in Israel are named after him.

Postage stamps of Sholem Aleichem were issued by Israel (Scott #154, 1959); the Soviet Union (Scott #2164, 1959); Romania (Scott #1268, 1959); and Ukraine (Scott #758, 2009).

An impact crater on the planet Mercury also bears his name.

On March 2, 2009, 150 years after his birth, the National Bank of Ukraine issued an anniversary coin depicting and celebrating Aleichem.

Vilnius, Lithuania has a Jewish school named after him and in Melbourne, Australia a Yiddish school, Sholem Aleichem College is named after him. Several Jewish schools in Argentina were also named after him.

In Rio de Janeiro, Brazil a library named BIBSA – Biblioteca Sholem Aleichem was founded in 1915 as a Zionist institution by a local Jewish group.  Next year, in 1916 same group that created BIBSA, founded a Jewish school named Escola Sholem Aleichem that was closed in 1997. BIBSA had a very active theatrical program in Yiddish for more than 50 years since its foundation and consistently performed Sholem Aleichem plays. In 1947 BIBSA became Associação Sholem Aleichem, under which name it continues to exist.  Both the library and club became communist institutions due to a normal transition of power in the founding group, although non-communist members left to found their own school, Colégio Eliezer Steinbarg, in 1956. It is named after the first director of Escola Sholem Aleichem, a Jewish writer born in Romania who immigrated to Brazil.

In the Bronx, New York, a housing complex called The Shalom Aleichem Houses was built by Yiddish speaking immigrants in the 1920s, and was recently restored by new owners to its original grandeur. The Shalom Alecheim Houses are part of a proposed historic district in the area.

On May 13, 2016 a Sholem Aleichem website was launched to mark the 100th anniversary of Sholem Aleichem's death. The website is a partnership between Sholem Aleichem's family, his biographer Professor Jeremy Dauber, Citizen Film, Columbia University's Center for Israel and Jewish Studies, The Covenant Foundation, and The Yiddish Book Center.  The website features interactive maps and timelines, recommended readings, as well as a list of centennial celebration events taking place worldwide. The website also features resources for educators.

Hertz Grosbard recited many of his works in so called "word concerts". A reading in Yiddish of his monologue If I Were a Rothschild and several others can be found on the Grosbard Project.

The writer's brother, Wolf Rabinovich, published the memoir "My Brother Sholom Aleichem" in Kyiv, Ukrainian SSR, in 1939. 

Sholem Aleichem's granddaughter, Bel Kaufman, by his daughter Lala (Lyalya), was an American author, most widely known for her novel, Up the Down Staircase, published in 1964, which was adapted to the stage and also made into a motion picture in 1967, starring Sandy Dennis.

Published works

English-language collections

 Tevye's Daughters: Collected Stories of Sholom Aleichem by Sholem Aleichem, transl Frances Butwin, illus Ben Shahn, NY: Crown, 1949. The stories which form the basis for Fiddler on the Roof.
 The Best of Sholom Aleichem, edited by R. Wisse, I. Howe (originally published 1979), Walker and Co., 1991, .
Tevye the Dairyman and the Railroad Stories, translated by H. Halkin (originally published 1987), Schocken Books, 1996, .
Nineteen to the Dozen: Monologues and Bits and Bobs of Other Things, translated by Ted Gorelick, Syracuse Univ Press, 1998, .
A Treasury of Sholom Aleichem Children's Stories, translated by Aliza Shevrin, Jason Aronson, 1996, .
 Inside Kasrilovka, Three Stories, translated by I. Goldstick, Schocken Books, 1948 (variously reprinted)
 The Old Country, translated by Julius & Frances Butwin, J B H of Peconic, 1999, .
 Stories and Satires, translated by Curt Leviant, Sholom Aleichem Family Publications, 1999, .
Selected Works of Sholem-Aleykhem, edited by Marvin Zuckerman & Marion Herbst (Volume II of "The Three Great Classic Writers of Modern Yiddish Literature"), Joseph Simon Pangloss Press, 1994, .
 Some Laughter, Some Tears, translated by Curt Leviant, Paperback Library, 1969, Library of Congress Catalog Card Number 68–25445.

Autobiography
 פונעם יאריד Funem yarid, written 1914–1916, translated as The Great Fair by Tamara Kahana, Noonday Press, 1955; translated by Curt Leviant as From the Fair, Viking, 1986, .

Novels
 Stempenyu: A Jewish Novel, originally published in his Folksbibliotek, adapted 1905 for the play Jewish Daughters.
 Yossele Solovey (1889, published in his Folksbibliotek)
 Tevye's Daughters, translated by F. Butwin (originally published 1949), Crown, 1959, .
 Mottel the Cantor's son.  Originally written in Yiddish. English version: Henry Schuman, Inc. New York 1953, Translated by Tamara Kahana (6a), the author's grand daughter.
 In The Storm
 Wandering Stars
 Marienbad, translated by Aliza Shevrin (1982, G.P. Putnam Sons, New York) from original Yiddish manuscript copyrighted by Olga Rabinowitz in 1917
 The Bloody Hoax
 Menahem-Mendl, translated as The Adventures of Menahem-Mendl, translated by Tamara Kahana, Sholom Aleichem Family Publications, 1969, .

Young adult literature
 The Bewitched Tailor, Sholom Aleichem Family Publications, 1999, .

Plays
 The Doctor (1887), one-act comedy
  (The Divorce, 1888), one-act comedy
  (The Assembly, 1889), one-act comedy
  (1889), one-act play
  (1894), a satire on brokers and speculators
  (Scattered Far and Wide, 1903), comedy
  (Agents, 1908), one-act comedy
  (Jewish Daughters, 1905) drama, adaptation of his early novel Stempenyu
  (The Golddiggers, 1907), comedy
  (Hard to Be a Jew / If I Were You, 1914)
  (The Big Lottery / The Jackpot, 1916)
 , (Tevye the Milkman, 1917, performed posthumously)

Stage
"The World of Sholom Aleichem

Television
"The World of Sholom Aleichem" 

Airdate:  December 14, 1959

Channel: WNTA-TV Channel 13, New York City

Written by Arnold Perl
Directed by Don Richardson
Produced by David Suskind & Henry T. Weinstein

Included 3 short tele-plays:
 "A Tale of Chelm" a folktale (author unknown)
 "Bontche Schweig" by I.L. Peretz
 "The High School" (aka "Gymnasium") by Sholem Aleichem.

Starring:
Gertrude Berg as Hannele ('The High School')
Morris Carnovsky as Rabbi David ('A Tale of Chelm'); Presiding Angel ('Bontche Shveig'}; Aaron Katz ('The High School')
Sam Levene as Narrator
Zero Mostel as the Melamed ('A Tale of Chelm')
Nancy Walker as Rifkele ('A Tale of Chelm')
Charlotte Rae as Angel ('A Tale of Chelm')
Lee Grant as Avenging Angel ('Bontche Shveig')
Jack Gilford as Bontshe Shveig ('Bontche Shveig')
Henry Lascoe as Dodi the Innkeeper ('A Tale of Chelm'); Principal ('The High School')

Miscellany
 Jewish Children, translated by Hannah Berman, William Morrow & Co, 1987, . 
 numerous stories in Russian, published in Voskhod (1891–1892)

See also
 1918 film: "Bloody Joke" (Кровавая шутка), based on the works of Sholem Aleichem, by director and screenwriter Alexander Arkatov

References

Further reading
 My Father, Sholom Aleichem, by Marie Waife-Goldberg
 Tradition!: The Highly Improbable, Ultimately Triumphant Broadway-to-Hollywood Story of Fiddler on the Roof, the World's Most Beloved Musical, by Barbara Isenberg, (St. Martin's Press, 2014.)
 Liptzin, Sol, A History of Yiddish Literature, Jonathan David Publishers, Middle Village, NY, 1972, . 66 et. seq.
 A Bridge of Longing, by David G. Roskies
 The World of Sholom Aleichem, by Maurice Samuel

External links

 The Official Sholem Aleichem Website
 
 
 
 Haaretz article A stenographer for his people's soul
 The complete works of Sholem Aleichem (searchable and editable; Yiddish letters only).

 

 
1859 births
1916 deaths
People from Pereiaslav
People from Pereyaslavsky Uyezd
Ukrainian Jews
Ukrainian Zionists
American Zionists
Hovevei Zion
Jewish Ukrainian writers
Jewish American writers
Emigrants from the Russian Empire to Switzerland
Emigrants from the Russian Empire to the United States
American people of Ukrainian-Jewish descent
Hebrew-language writers
Jewish dramatists and playwrights
19th-century male writers
20th-century male writers
Yiddish-language satirists
Tuberculosis deaths in New York (state)
20th-century deaths from tuberculosis
Deaths from diabetes
19th-century pseudonymous writers
20th-century pseudonymous writers